Vellivelichathil is a 2014 Indian Malayalam film directed by Madhu Kaithapram, starring John Brittas and Iniya in the leading roles. This is the first Malayalam film to be shot entirely in Muscat, Oman.

Plot
The plot revolves around the life of Upendran, played by John Brittas, who falls in love with and wishes to marry a bar dancer, played by Iniya. The lives of NRI Malayalees are portrayed by the other characters in the movie, depicting their daily struggles.

Cast
 John Brittas as Upendran
 Iniya
 Geeta Poduval
 Suraj Venjaramoodu
 Lalu Alex
 Raveendran
 Tini Tom
 Sudheer Karamana
 Sreejith Ravi
 Renny Johnson
 Neena Kurup

Music
The music soundtrack for the movie was released by Satyam Audios.

Track listing

Reception 
The film received mixed reviews and did not do too well in the box office. The Times of India movie reviews rated the movie with 1 and a half stars and calling Madhu Kaithapram's effort a lazy act of self-indulgence.
The Satellite rights for the movie were secured by Asianet.

References

2014 films
2010s Malayalam-language films